Cassinia aureonitens, commonly known as the yellow cassinia is a species of flowering plant in the family Asteraceae and is endemic to eastern New South Wales. It is a shrub with elliptic leaves and heads of yellow flowers arranged in dense corymbs.

Description

Taxonomy
Yellow cassinia was first formally described in 1818 by Robert Brown and given the name Cassinia aurea in the Transactions of the Linnean Society of London, but the name was illegitimate because Brown had used the same name in 1813 for a different species now known as Angianthus tomentosus. In 1951 Norman Arthur Wakefield designated the name Cassinia aureonitens for this species, publishing the new name in The Victorian Naturalist.

Distribution and habitat
Cassinia aureonitens grows in heath and woodland on the coast of New South Wales between Taree and Eden and inland to the Central Tablelands.

References

aureonitens
Asterales of Australia
Flora of New South Wales
Plants described in 1818
Taxa named by Robert Brown (botanist, born 1773)